Entypus unifasciatus is a species of spider wasp in the family Pompilidae.

Description
Theses spider wasps are black with a bluish sheen, yellow antennae, and usually have a single diffuse amber band or patch near the tip of dark, smoky wings.

Range
Essentially transcontinental North America, except in the northwest.

Ecology
Female wasps paralyze large spiders and deposit them in burrows. The wasp lays a fertilized egg upon the spider; after hatching, the larva feeds on the living but paralyzed spider until maturing into a pupa that overwinters, and emerges as a winged adult next summer.

Taxonomy
Entypus unifasciatus contains the following subspecies:
 Entypus unifasciatus cressoni
 Entypus unifasciatus dumosus
 Entypus unifasciatus californicus
 Entypus unifasciatus unifasciatus

References

External links

Pompilidae
Hymenoptera